The Columbus Downtown Historic District is located in Columbus, Wisconsin.

History
The district is the old commercial heart of town around the junction of Dickason Blvd and James St, including many cream brick buildings built by Richard Vanaken and Henry Boelte. Notable buildings include the 1852 Corner Drug, the 1858 Italianate Whitney Hotel, the 1865 First National Bank (restyled Neoclassical in 1916), the 1892 Richardsonian Romanesque Hotel Tremont, and the 1903 Bonnett's Millinery Shop.

The district includes the work of Louis Sullivan. It was featured in the 2009 film Public Enemies.

Gallery

References

Historic districts on the National Register of Historic Places in Wisconsin
National Register of Historic Places in Columbia County, Wisconsin